Eric Nkulukuta Miala (born 6 September 1982) is a Congolese former footballer who plays as a right-back.

Club career
Nkulukuta was born in Kinshasa. He joined TP Mazembe from Daring Club Motema Pembe in 2006.

International career
Nkulukuta played for the Democratic Republic of the Congo national team. He later played in a match against Nigeria in a 5–2 loss. Nkulukuta also played for the national team during qualifications for the 2006 World Cup.

References

1982 births
Living people
Democratic Republic of the Congo footballers
Footballers from Kinshasa
Association football fullbacks
Democratic Republic of the Congo international footballers
Daring Club Motema Pembe players
TP Mazembe players
21st-century Democratic Republic of the Congo people